Arthur Rambo is a French drama film directed by Laurent Cantet and released in 2021. The film stars Rabah Nait Oufella as Karim D., freely inspired by the story of Mehdi Meklat. The cast also includes Antoine Reinartz, Sofian Khammes, Anaël Snoek and Aleksandra Yermak. The film entered production in fall 2019. It premiered at the 2021 Toronto International Film Festival in the Platform Prize program. It had its European premiere in the Golden Shell competition at the 69th San Sebastián International Film Festival.

Plot
Karim D. is a young writer riding success with the new novel The Landing. A rare Arab rising star in Paris' intellectual hothouse, his social life shunts between glittering literary cocktails and hanging with his old friends from the banlieues. But Karim's teen online identity under the alias Arthur Rambo is revealed, a nickname in which a poet (Arthur Rimbaud) and a rejected veteran (Rambo) coexist, and the two worlds collide. Where Karim is now a nuanced author, "Arthur Rambo" was profane and blindly provocative, tweeting out hate-fuelled homophobic and anti-Semitic messages to get a rise out of bourgeois France.

Cast
 Rabah Nait Oufella as Karim D.
 Antoine Reinartz as Nicolas
 Sofian Khammes as Rachid
 Anaël Snoek as Clio Balan

Release
The film premièred at the Toronto International Film Festival on 11 September 2021 and in Europe at the 69th San Sebastián International Film Festival on 20 September 2021. It was first theatrically released in France on 2 February 2022.

Reception

Box office
Arthur Rambo grossed grossed $0 in the United States and Canada, and a worldwide total of $162,902, against a production budget of about $4.2 million.

Critical response
On review aggregator Rotten Tomatoes, the film holds an approval rating of 56% based on 9 reviews, with an average rating of 7/10.

References

External links

2021 films
2021 drama films
French drama films
Films directed by Laurent Cantet
Films set in Paris
Films shot in Paris
2020s French films